Mayerfeld is a surname. Notable people with the surname include:

 Michael Mayerfeld Bell (born 1957), American sociologist, author, and musician
 Uri Mayerfeld, Canadian rabbi